The 43rd Infantry Division was a formation of the United States Army from 1920 to 1963, serving in the Pacific during World War II. It was activated in 1920 as a National Guard Division in Connecticut, Maine, Rhode Island, and Vermont. The 143rd Regional Support Group of the Connecticut National Guard now carries on the heritage.

Creation and interwar period
The 1920 amendments to the National Defense Act of 1916 provided for eighteen National Guard divisions. Seventeen National Guard divisions had served in the First World War; the 42nd "Rainbow" Division was not reconstituted after the war, and the 39th "Delta" Division was eliminated from the force structure in 1923 by being renamed the 31st Division. The 43rd, 44th, and 45th Divisions were constituted as new units. The 43rd Division was allotted as the National Guard division for New England, replacing the 26th Division which became an all-Massachusetts outfit. The 43rd Infantry Division was constituted on 19 October 1920, with the division headquarters being organized and federally recognized in Hartford, Connecticut, on 21 March 1925. The 43rd Division consisted of two infantry brigades, the 85th in Connecticut, and the 86th in Vermont. The 85th Brigade included the 102nd and 169th Infantry Regiment, both based in Connecticut. The 86th Brigade was made up of the 172nd Infantry Regiment in Vermont and the 103rd Infantry in Maine. In addition, the 68th Field Artillery Brigade was based in Providence, Rhode Island.

Order of battle, 1924 and 1939 

An asterisk indicates the state of headquarters allocation; the headquarters was not yet organized or was inactive. The 170th Infantry was redesignated as the 102nd Infantry on 28 February 1924.

World War II
The 43rd Division was mobilized for federal service on 24 February 1941.  It was reorganized as a "triangular" division meaning that it had three infantry regiments, rather than four infantry regiments organized into two brigades.

The 43rd was originally sent to Camp Blanding, Florida where it was based prior to participating in the Louisiana Maneuvers of 1941 and the Carolina Maneuvers later that same year.  The division relocated to Camp Shelby, Mississippi on 14 February 1942 and was officially re-designated as the 43rd Infantry Division on 19 February 1942.

The division staged for shipment overseas at Fort Ord, California on 6 September 1942 and departed San Francisco on 1 October.  The division arrived in New Zealand on 23 October 1942, prior to being committed to combat in the South West Pacific Theater under the command of General Douglas MacArthur.

Ordered into federal service: 24 February 1941.
Overseas: 1 October 1942.
Campaigns: New Guinea, Northern Solomons, Luzon.
Presidential Unit Citations: 4 Infantry Battalions (Luzon).
Personal Awards: MH-2 ; DSC-40 ; DSM-2 ; SS-736 ; LM-53; SM-51 ; BSM-2,496 ; AM-27.
Commanders: Maj. Gen. Morris B. Payne (February–August 1941), Maj. Gen. John H. Hester (8 October 1941-July 1943), Maj. Gen. John R. Hodge (July 1943 to August 1943), Maj. Gen. Leonard F. Wing (August 1943 to inactivation).
Returned to U.S.: 19 October 1945.
Inactivated: 26 October 1945.

Order of battle

 Headquarters, 43rd Infantry Division
 103rd Infantry Regiment
 169th Infantry Regiment
 172nd Infantry Regiment
 Headquarters and Headquarters Battery, 43rd Infantry Division Artillery
 103rd Field Artillery Battalion (105 mm)
 152nd Field Artillery Battalion (105 mm)
 169th Field Artillery Battalion (105 mm)
 192nd Field Artillery Battalion (155 mm)
 118th Engineer Combat Battalion
 118th Medical Battalion
43rd Cavalry Reconnaissance Troop (Mechanized)
 Headquarters, Special Troops, 43rd Infantry Division
 Headquarters Company, 43rd Infantry Division
 743rd Ordnance Light Maintenance Company
 43rd Quartermaster Company
 43rd Signal Company
 Military Police Platoon
 Band
 43rd Counterintelligence Detachment

Combat chronicle

The 43rd Infantry Division landed in New Zealand on 23 October 1942. The 172nd Infantry Regiment arrived at Espiritu Santo, 26 October.

The division moved to Noumea, New Caledonia, in November and to Guadalcanal, 17 February 1943. The Russell Islands were occupied without opposition, 21 February, and training continued. Elements landed on Vangunu and Rendova Islands against minor resistance, 30 June.

Rendova served as the major staging point for the assault on the island of New Georgia. The assault on New Georgia was met with determined enemy resistance. The Japanese fought fiercely before relinquishing Munda and its airfield, 5 August. Vela Cela and Baanga were taken easily, but the Japanese resisted stubbornly on Arundel Island before withdrawing, 22 September.

After training at Munda, the 43rd moved to Guadalcanal and thence to New Zealand for rest and rehabilitation. On 19 July 1944, the division was deployed to the Aitape-Wewak campaign, assuming defensive positions at Aitape. It engaged in patrols and reconnaissance at Tadji and along the Drinumor River, 25 July, and took the offensive, 8 August 1944, ending organized resistance on the 25th. On 9 January 1945, the 43rd made an assault landing in the San Fabian area, Lingayen Gulf, Luzon. Under enemy fire, the Division secured the beachhead and fought into the Lingayen Plain by 12 February. The offensive was resumed against the enemy north and west of Fort Stotsenburg, 27 February. After ending Japanese resistance in the Zambales Mountains with help from the Philippine Commonwealth Army and Philippine Constabulary, the 43rd swung south against the Shimbu Line. On 6 May 1945, the attack continued in the Bulacan area. Ipo Dam was secured and enemy opposition smashed in the Ipo area, 19 May. Mopping-up activities continued until 30 June 1945. The Division left Manila, 7 September 1945, and arrived in Yokohama, Japan on 13 September for occupation duty. The division began preparations for departure for home on 27 September 1945, and officially began their departure on 29 September. The first ship arrived in San Francisco on 8 October 1945, three years and seven days after the first ship had left on 1 October 1942. The division troops were then moved to Camp Stoneman near Pittsburg, California, and arrangements were made to send each man to the Army separation center nearest his home.

Casualties

Total battle casualties: 6,026
Killed in action: 1,128
Wounded in action: 4,887
Missing in action: 9
Prisoner of war: 2

Post World War II (1946-1963)

In 1946 the Division was reorganized again, and was now made up of units from Connecticut, Vermont and Rhode Island. The 172d Infantry with the 206th Field Artillery Battalion were based in Vermont. The division headquarters, 102d and 169th Infantry Regiments, and 963d Field Artillery and 192d Field Artillery were organized in Connecticut. In addition, Connecticut was also home to the 143d Tank Battalion. Rhode Island was home to Headquarters, 43d Division Artillery; the 103d Field Artillery Battalion; the 118th Engineer Battalion; and the 43d Signal Company. Combat Support units were based throughout all three states.

During the Korean War, the 43d Division was again ordered into active Federal Service on 5 September 1950 and was moved to Seventh United States Army, VII Corps in West Germany in 1951. On 15 June 1954, the 43d Infantry Division was released and returned to state control. Its elements, stationed in the Augsburg/Munich area, were reflagged as the units of the 5th Infantry Division. Division elements in the Nuernberg Area such as the 169th Infantry Regiment became units of the 9th Infantry Division.  The 169th Infantry reflagged as the 39th Infantry Regiment. 

The 43d Infantry Division was inactivated on 1 May 1963 as a result of National Guard restructuring. Its headquarters was reorganized as Headquarters Company, 43d Brigade, 26th Infantry Division aka the YANKEE Division. The 43d Brigade was relieved from assignment to the 26th Division on 1 September 1993, when the 26th Division was inactivated. It was then reorganized as Headquarters Company, 43d Infantry Brigade and now organized as the Headquarters Company, 143d Regional Support Group.

Commanding officers
Morris B. Payne, July 1927 to August 1941
John H. Hester, August 1941 to July 1943
John R. Hodge, July 1943 to August 1943
Leonard F. Wing, August 1943 to November 1945

Recognition
U.S. Route 7 is signed as the 43rd Infantry Division Memorial Highway between Norwalk and Danbury, CT.
Vermont Route 100 is signed as the 43 Infantry Division Highway.

Notes

References
The Army Almanac: A Book of Facts Concerning the Army of the United States U.S. Government Printing Office, 1950 reproduced at CMH.

"The History of the 43rd Infantry Division" by Colonel Joseph E. Zimmer (Retired). Published by: The Army and Navy Publishing Co., Baton Rouge, La.

043d Infantry Division, U.S.
Infantry Division, U.S. 043d
Military units and formations established in 1925
Military units and formations disestablished in 1963
Military in Connecticut
Connecticut National Guard
Infantry divisions of the United States Army in World War II